Hydroxytertatolol is a beta blocker.   It is a derivative of tertatolol.

References

Beta blockers
Thiochromanes
N-tert-butyl-phenoxypropanolamines